Major General Sir Eric Bertram Rowcroft  (28 January 1891 – 27 December 1963), was a British Army officer. His military career started in 1908 as a TA Officer in the Royal Engineers and retired at the rank of Major General in 1946. He is noted for his involvement in the formation of The Corps of Royal Electrical and Mechanical Engineers (REME) and the planning of Operation Overlord.

Family and education
Rowcroft was the son of Colonel George Francis Rowcroft. He was educated at Haileybury and the Royal Military College, Sandhurst.

Military career
After his initial involvement with the TA, Rowcroft received his commission in 1911 after he passed out of Sandhurst into the Army Service Corps. At the outbreak of the First World War he served with the BEF overseas serving with various mechanical transport units. By 1918, Rowcroft worked at the War Office in a technical capacity. During the interwar period he served in India, Ceylon and even at the Tank Inspection Department, at Woolwich Arsenal. His Army Career continued along the Technical route when in 1936 he was appointed Commander Royal Army Service Corps (RASC), 1st Division in Palestine during the 1936–1939 Arab revolt in Palestine.

Second World War
On the outbreak of the Second World War, Rowcroft was in command of the RASC Training Battalion, back in the UK. However the repair and recovery element within the British Army was divided between the various service corps of the time, this was considered inefficient. By 1942 REME was formed to recover and maintain the army's equipment, both in the battlefield and in the rear area, with Rowcroft becoming its first Director.

Later life
For his efforts during the Second World War Rowcroft was appointed a Companion of the Order of the Bath (CB) in 1944, and in 1946 on his retirement from the Army he became a Knight of the Order of the British Empire (KBE). However, his involvement in the REME continued until 1956, as he served in the capacity of Colonel Commandant. During his later years he got heavily involved in local affairs in his home town of Lyme Regis, where he died in 1963.

See also
Royal Army Service Corps
The Corps of Royal Electrical and Mechanical Engineers
Operation Overlord
REME Museum of Technology

References

Bibliography

External links
Generals of World War II

1891 births
1963 deaths
British Army personnel of World War I
Graduates of the Royal Military College, Sandhurst
British Army generals of World War II
Royal Army Service Corps officers
Knights Commander of the Order of the British Empire
Companions of the Order of the Bath
People educated at Haileybury and Imperial Service College
Military personnel from London
British military personnel of the 1936–1939 Arab revolt in Palestine
War Office personnel in World War II